The Tale of the Stone Flower, Op. 118, is Sergei Prokofiev's eighth and last ballet, written between 1948 and 1953. It is based on the Russian Ural folk tale The Stone Flower by Pavel Bazhov and is also the last of the trilogy of ballets Prokofiev wrote in the Russian ballet tradition. It was premiered posthumously in 1954, conducted by Yuri Fayer.

Numbers
Prologue
1       The Mistress of the Copper Mountain
2       Danila and his work
Act I
Scene 1      
3       Danila in search of the flower
4       Danila meets some fellow villagers
5       Scene and Duet of Katerina and Danila
6       Interlude
Scene 2
7       Round Dance
8       Katerina dances with her friends 
9       The Peasant Girls' Dance
10      Danila's and Katerina's Dance
11      The unmarried men's dance
12      Severyan's Dance
13      Altercation over the malachite vase
14      Scene of Katerina and Danila
15      Danila's Meditation
Scene 3
16      Danila enticed away by the Mistress of the Copper Mountain
Act II
Scene 4
17      The Mistress shows Danila the treasures of the earth
18      Duet of the Mistress and Danila
19      Scene and Waltz of the Diamonds
20      Dance of the Russian precious stones
21      Waltz
22      Danila's Monologue and the Mistress' Reply
23      The Mistress shows Danila the stone flower
24      Severyan and the Workers; The Mistress' Warning
Scene 5
25      Scene and Katerina's Dance
26      Severyan's Arrival
27      "Where are you, sweet Danila?"
28      The Appearance of the Mistress; Katerina's Joy
Scene 6
29      Ural Rhapsody
30      Interlude
31      Russian Dance
Scene 7
32      Gypsy Dance
33      Severyan's Dance
34      Solo of the Gypsy Girl and Coda
35      Katerina's Appearance and Severyan's Rage
36      The Appearance of the Mistress and Scene of Severyan transfixed to the earth
37      Severyan follows the Mistress
38      Severyan dies
Scene 8
39      Katerina sits by the fire and yearns for Danila
40      Scene and Dance of Katerina and the skipping of the Fire Spirits
41      Katerina follows the Fire Spirits
42      Dialogue of Katerina and the Mistress
43      Danila turned to stone
44      The Joy of the reuniting of Katerina and Danila
45      The Mistress presents gifts to Katerina and Danila
46      Epilogue

Instrumentation
The work is scored for an orchestra consisting of 2 flutes (2nd doubling piccolo), 2 oboes (2nd doubling cor anglais), 2 clarinets (1st doubling E-flat clarinet, 2nd doubling bass clarinet), 2 bassoons (2nd doubling contrabassoon), 4 french horns, 3 trumpets, 3 trombones, tuba, timpani, percussion (triangle, castanets, wood blocks, tambourine, snare drum, cymbals, bass drum, tam-tam, tubular bells, xylophone), harp, piano, and strings.

Premiere
12 February 1954, Bolshoi Theater, Moscow, conducted by Yuri Fayer. Choreography by Yuri Grigorovich.

Recordings

Orchestral suites from The Tale of the Stone Flower
As usual, Prokofiev extracted music from the ballet for concert performance.

Wedding Suite, Op. 126 (1951)
Available recordings:

Gypsy Fantasy, Op. 127 (1951)
Available recordings:

Urals Rhapsody, Op. 128 (1951)
There are no available recordings.

The Mistress of the Copper Mountain, Op. 129
Available recordings:

See also
 List of ballets by title

References

External links
The Tale of the Stone Flower at prokofiev.org

Ballets by Sergei Prokofiev
1954 ballet premieres
1950 compositions
Ballets premiered at the Bolshoi Theatre
Ballets based on fairy tales